The 1990 Midwestern Collegiate Conference men's basketball tournament (now known as the Horizon League men's basketball tournament) was held March 8–10 at UD Arena in Dayton, Ohio.

Dayton defeated Xavier in the championship game, 85–78. The win, on Dayton's home court, denied the Musketeers a fifth consecutive MCC/Horizon League men's basketball tournament title. It was Dayton's first MCC/Horizon League tourney title.

The Flyers received an automatic bid to the 1990 NCAA tournament as the #12 seed in the Midwest region. Xavier, the regular season conference champions, received an at-large bid as the #6 seed in the Midwest region.

Format
All eight conference members participated in the tournament and were seeded based on regular season conference records.

Bracket

References

Horizon League men's basketball tournament
Tournament
Midwestern City Conference men's basketball tournament
Midwestern City Conference men's basketball tournament